Naker may refer to:

One of the two Islamic angels, Munkar and Nakir, who visit the dead after their funeral
the European variant of the Naqareh, a small Arabic kettle-drum, called nakers in English